The 2016 Pau Grand Prix was a Formula Three motor race held on 15 May 2016 at the Pau circuit, in Pau, Pyrénées-Atlantiques, France. The Grand Prix was run as the third round of the 2016 European Formula 3 Championship and was won by Alessio Lorandi, driving for Carlin. Lance Stroll finished second and George Russell third.

Entry List

Classification

Race

References

Pau Grand Prix
2016 in French motorsport